Painting is the art or process of applying paints to a surface such as canvas, to make a picture or other artistic composition. The noun painting also refers to the end product a composition or picture made in this way.

Painting may also be the occupation of a house painter and decorator.

People with the surname 

 Norman Painting (1924–2009), British radio actor

Art, entertainment, and media

Music
Albums
 Painting (album), a 2013 album by Ocean Colour Scene
Songs
 "Painting", a song by Atmosphere from When Life Gives You Lemons, You Paint That Shit Gold
 "Painting", a song by Blindside from Silence
 "The Painting" (song), a 2008 song off the album Everything That Happens Will Happen Today

Other art, entertainment, and media
Artwork
 Painting (1946), an oil-on-linen painting by Francis Bacon
Films
 The Painting (film), a 2012 French animated film by Jean-François Laguionie
Television
 "The Painting" (episode), a 1989 The Super Mario Bros. Super Show! live-action episode

Other uses
 "Painting the target", a process in laser guidance systems

See also 
 Paint (disambiguation)
 Painter (disambiguation)